Born Innocent is a 1974 American made-for-television drama film which was first aired under the NBC World Premiere Movie umbrella on September 17, 1974. Highly publicized and controversial, Born Innocent was the highest-rated television movie to air in the United States in 1974. The movie deals with the physical, psychological and sexual abuse of a teenage girl, and included graphic content never before seen on American television.

Plot
Christine "Chris" Parker (Linda Blair) is a 14-year-old runaway who, after getting arrested many times, is sentenced to spend time in a girls' juvenile detention center. It is revealed that Chris comes from an abusive home. Her father (Richard Jaeckel) would beat her on a regular basis, which led to her repeated flights from home. Her mother (Kim Hunter) is unfeeling, sitting in her recliner, watching television and smoking cigarettes all day, and in complete denial as to what her husband is doing. Chris' older brother Tom (Mitch Vogel) is aware of the abuse, but he is unable to help Chris, as he is absorbed with the care of his own family.

Chris' social worker Emma Lasko (Allyn Ann McLerie) never realizes that her dysfunctional parents are the cause of her troubles, and the juvenile justice system places the blame for her troubles on Chris herself. With the exception of one dedicated counselor named Barbara Clark (Joanna Miles), the reform school personnel are mostly apathetic and allow an unhealthy, destructive culture to fester. Despite Barbara's attempts to help Christine talk about her problems, Chris refuses to open up to her or anyone else about her abuse.

After Chris is attacked in the shower and sexually assaulted by her fellow inmates, as well as witnessing a pregnant resident whom Chris befriends suffer a miscarriage while in isolation, and the pervasive indifference of the staff, Chris – feeling abandoned by the system in addition to her family – becomes angry, cold and bitter. When an argument between Chris and Ms. Lasko turns physical, a riot ensues. Chris is investigated for causing the riot. She calmly maintains that she had nothing to do with it. In the final shot, Barbara looks on helplessly as she sees Chris, an innocent, intelligent, decent girl, transformed into a violent, pathological, manipulative, vengeful and cold person, devoid of guilt or remorse for her actions, who is destined  to become a criminal adult when released upon reaching legal age.

Cast
 Linda Blair as Chris Parker
 Joanna Miles as Counselor Barbara Clark
 Allyn Ann McLerie as Emma Lasko
 Mary Murphy as Miss Murphy
 Janit Baldwin as Denny
 Nora Heflin as Moco
 Tina Andrews as Josie
 Sandra Ego as Janet
 Mitch Vogel as Tom Parker
 Richard Jaeckel as Mr. Parker
 Kim Hunter as Mrs. Parker
 Adrienne White as Ria
 Janice Lorraine Garcia as Child at funeral

Controversial rape scene
The original cut of Born Innocent contained a scene where several girls, led by Moco (Nora Heflin) and Denny (Janit Baldwin), use a plunger handle to rape Chris in the communal showers.

Born Innocent is credited with being one of the catalysts for the National Association of Broadcasters creating a family viewing policy. University of Wisconsin–Milwaukee educator Elena Levine pointed out that the film was advertised in The New York Times alongside the television show Born Free, which she theorized may have encouraged viewers to believe the film to be family friendly.

The film made several negative references to lesbianism. One version of the script implied that the character Moco's lesbianism was a result of her surroundings and prompted her abuse of Chris and others.

The film was criticized by the National Organization for Women, the New York Rape Coalition, and numerous gay and lesbian rights organizations for its depiction of female-on-female sexual abuse; the Lesbian Feminist Liberation dismissed the film, stating: "Men rape, women don't," and regarded the film as "propaganda against lesbians." The shower scene was eventually cut from the film due to multiple complaints.

Lawsuit over copycat crime 
The film was blamed for the rape of a nine-year-old child on Baker Beach, San Francisco, by some of her peers using a glass soda pop bottle. Valeria Niemi, the victim's mother, sued NBC and asked for damages up to $11 million. Her lawsuit cited the facts that one of the perpetrators, Sharon Smith (the only one jailed for the attack, having been sentenced to three years in a federal prison), evoked the movie when she was arrested, and that William Thomas, 14, the boy who provided the bottle, asked if it will be "like it was done in the picture". Two other girls, 10 and 15, and the boy who served as lookout saw charges dropped.
In 1981, the California Supreme Court ruled the film was not obscene, and that the NBC network was not liable for the actions of the persons who committed the crime.

Effect on rape awareness 

Blair cited what she felt was one positive outcome of the film, saying that she thought it made it easier for rape survivors to come forward.

Subsequent airing
In a response to the incident, re-airings in the late 1970s and 1980s did not air any of the rape sequence. The California rape influenced the establishment of the Family Viewing Hour which became briefly mandatory for the networks in the late 1970s, as the movie was aired at 8 to 9pm Eastern Time, when some children may not have been in bed.

Home media
After the edited re-airings in the 1980s, the uncut version appeared on VHS in numerous budget-priced editions. In 2004, VCI Entertainment released Born Innocent on DVD with the rape scene included. More recently, a remastered version of the unedited version is available on the Shout Factory Channel via Amazon Prime.

See also
 List of American films of 1974

References

External links

American LGBT-related television films
1974 television films
Films directed by Donald Wrye
Women in prison films
1970s thriller drama films
American thriller drama films
1974 LGBT-related films
Films shot in New Mexico
1974 films
Works subject to a lawsuit
Films about rape
NBC network original films
Films scored by Fred Karlin
Films about runaways
1974 drama films
American drama television films
1970s English-language films
1970s American films